John Quincy Trapp (born October 2, 1945) is an American retired professional basketball player.

A 6'7" forward from the University of Nevada, Las Vegas, Trapp played five seasons (1968–1973) in the National Basketball Association (NBA) as a member of the San Diego Rockets, Los Angeles Lakers, and Philadelphia 76ers.  He averaged 7.4 points per game in his NBA career and won a league championship with the Lakers in 1972.

Trapp also played briefly in the American Basketball Association as a member of the Denver Rockets.

Personal life 
Trapp's younger brother, George, also played at Pasadena City College (PCC) and in the NBA.  Both of the Trapp brothers are in the PCC Athletics Hall of Fame with John honored in 2002.

References

External links

1945 births
Living people
American men's basketball players
Basketball players from Detroit
Denver Rockets players
Los Angeles Lakers players
Pasadena City Lancers men's basketball players
Philadelphia 76ers players
Power forwards (basketball)
San Diego Rockets draft picks
San Diego Rockets players
UNLV Runnin' Rebels basketball players